Dimitris Konstantinou (born 6 January 1989) is a Greek footballer, who currently plays for Ethnikos Piraeus in the Football League 2 as a defensive midfielder.

He started his career in the academies of Atromitos, before he got his transfer to Apollon Smyrni. After 5 years, he got a transfer to A.O Pefki; but after 6 months, he left the team and joined the German team Malchower. He stayed there for 2.5 years before he returned to Greece for 2016-17 season with Rodos. In July 2017, he transferred to Ethnikos Piraeus.

External links

Dimitris Konstantinou

1989 births
Living people
Association football midfielders
Atromitos F.C. players
Apollon Smyrnis F.C. players
A.O Pefki F.C. players
Malchower SV players
Rodos F.C. players
Ethnikos Piraeus F.C. players
Footballers from Athens
Greek footballers
Greek expatriate sportspeople in Germany
Greek expatriate footballers
Expatriate footballers in Germany